The Mount Pleasant Line, designated Routes 42 and 43, is a daily bus route in Washington, D.C., It was a streetcar line until the 1960s.

Route Description and Service

Both route 42 and 43 operates at nearly all hours of the day during the week, with slightly reduced hours on weekends. Route 43 operates between 6:00 am and 10:00 pm daily operating every other trip alongside the 42. Both routes operate out of Western division 

Routes 42 and 43 begin at Mount Pleasant Street and 17th Street NW in Mount Pleasant, and head south on Mount Pleasant Street NW and Columbia Road NW until they arrive at an intersection with Connecticut Avenue NW and California Street NW. The routes turn southbound onto Connecticut Avenue, continuing south towards Dupont Circle. Route 42 travels around the circle, providing access to the Dupont Circle station on the Red Line at both Q Street and just south of the circle. Route 43 travels via the Connecticut Avenue underpass, bypassing these two stops as well as a northbound stop at R Street. The routes then continue to Farragut Square, traveling through Potomac Park before terminating at the Kennedy Center.

History
Route 40 and 42 initially began operation as the Mount Pleasant Streetcar Line, operated by the Washington Rail & Electric Company in 1872. The Horsecar, which these lines originally operated on, were eventually replaced by electric streetcars between the years of 1896 and 1900. Route 40 operated all the way between the Mount Pleasant neighborhood and Seat Pleasant, Maryland, via Downtown Washington DC, and route 42 operated between Mount Pleasant and the Kingman Park neighborhood. 

Both routes began at Mount Pleasant and ran to H Street, turning east there, south on 14th Street NW, and east on F Street NW along the F Street Line. At 5th Street NW, Route 40 turned south, continuing east around the north side of the Capitol and along East Capitol Street to 15th Street NE, while Route 42 turned north and east past Union Station on the East Washington Line, ending at D Street NE and 13th Street NE. On the other hand, 40 would operate further east towards Seat Pleasant, MD, via East Capitol Street NE, Southern Avenue NE, 63rd Street NE, Eastern Avenue NE, 61st Street NE, Dix Street NE, 63rd Street NE, Southern Avenue NE, and East Capitol Street NE.

The line was later acquired by the Capital Traction Company in the 1930s, then operated under DC Transit in 1956. The 40 and 42 streetcar lines were replaced by buses on December 3, 1961 (route 42) and January 28, 1962 (route 40). Eventually, on February 4, 1973, the 40 and 42 were acquired by WMATA when they acquired DC Transit and three bus companies that operated throughout the Washington Metropolitan Area and merged them all together to form its own, Metrobus System.

On March 27, 1976 when Farragut North station, Metro Center station, Judiciary Square station, and Union Station opened, routes 40 and 42 began serving each of the stations in the middle of the routes.

On January 17, 1977 when Dupont Circle station opened, both routes 40 and 42 serving the Dupont Circle station in the middle of their routes. No route changes were made during this particular time.

On September 24, 1978, route 42 was extended southeast of its original terminus at the intersection of D and 13th Street NE in Kingman Park, to instead terminate at the newly opened Stadium–Armory station while route 40 began serving the new station. Routes 40 and 42 also went through another minor rerouting change to serve the District of Columbia General Hospital, located adjacent to Stadium Armory.

A new route 44 was introduced to operate parallel to route 42 between Stadium–Armory station and Mount Pleasant, in order to provide additional service on the Mount Pleasant Line between those two points. Also routes 45 and 46 were introduced and also operated alongside the 40, 42, and 44. Route 45 operated between Mount Pleasant and the Bureau of Engraving and route 46 operated between Mount Pleasant and the Kennedy Center.

On January 4, 1981, roughly two months after the Capitol Heights station opened, route 40  was truncated to only operate between Mount Pleasant and Capitol Heights station, via Metro Center, Washington Union Station, and Stadium–Armory station. The segment of 40's routing between Capitol Heights station and the former terminus in Seat Pleasant, Maryland, was replaced by route F14. Route U8 also began operating on the particular segment of routes 42 and 44 between Seat Pleasant and Capitol Heights station, during the early 1990s once it was introduced. No changes were made to the 42, 44, 45, 46 Metrobus Routes, which operated as part of the Mount Pleasant Line.

Between the 1980s and 1990s, route 45 was discontinued and replace by routes 40, 42, 44, and 46.

In March, 1995, routes 40, 44, and 46 were discontinued and 42 was truncated to only operate between Mount Pleasant and Metro Center. The segment of 40, 42, and 44's route between Metro Center station and Washington Union Station, was replaced by the Sibley Hospital–Stadium Armory Line (D1, D3, and D6). The segment of 40, 42, and 44's route between Union Station and Stadium–Armory station, was also replaced by the D6 plus the 96 and 97. The remaining segment of 40's route between Union Station and Capitol Heights station, was replaced by the 96 and 97.

On December 28, 2008, a new route 43 was introduced to operate alongside 42 between Mount Pleasant and Farragut Square skipping Dupont Circle station via the Connecticut Avenue underpass. Route 43 will operate during the weekday peak-hours in the peak direction to alleviate crowding problems on the 42.

In 2019, WMATA proposed to add daily service to route 43 which will bypass Dupont Circle station. The proposal would alternate with Route 42 trips serving Dupont Circle. Route 42 only would continue to operate early mornings and late nights daily, and evenings on Sundays only. This was due to the following reasons:
 Respond to customer suggestions and public feedback:
 This service plan was recommended in the Metrobus Service Evaluation Study: Mount Pleasant Line: 42, 43 and Connecticut Avenue Line: L1, L2 from October 2018.
 Operating more trips under Dupont Circle will avoid congestion and provide faster travel time for passengers continuing past Dupont Circle in each direction.
 Red Line connections will be maintained at Dupont Circle station on route 42 and at Farragut North station on routes 42 and 43.
 Adjust running time to provide a more realistic schedule and improve on-time performance and service reliability, with the goal of reaching at least 80% on-time performance in all time-periods. Recent on-time performance for the line is outlined below:

During the COVID-19 pandemic, route 43 was suspended and route 42 was reduced to operate on its Saturday supplemental schedule during the weekdays beginning on March 16, 2020. On March 18, 2020, the line was further reduced to operate on its Sunday schedule. Weekend service was later suspended on March 21, 2020.

On August 23, 2020, route 43 was extended to Gallery Place station and Metro Center station via the 42 routing along H Street, I Street, 9th Street, F Street, and 11th Street. Route 43 also added daily service operating every other trip from the 42, travelling underneath Dupont Circle and skipping Dupont Circle station. Service will run between 6:00 AM to 10:00 PM daily.

In February 2021 during the FY2022 budget, WMATA proposed to eliminate the 42 and 43 routing between Farragut Square and Gallery Place station due to alternative services. It however would operate every 12 minutes daily.

On September 5, 2021, Routes 42 and 43 were rerouted to operate to the Kennedy Center via 18th Street, 19th Street, and Virginia Avenue NW to replace Route 80 service. Service to Gallery Place and Metro Center was eliminated.

References

External links
 Metrobus

Street railways in Washington, D.C.
42
Adams Morgan
Dupont Circle
Mount Pleasant (Washington, D.C.)
1961 establishments in Washington, D.C.